Koshoy (before 2002: Калиновка Kalinovka) is a village in the Chüy District, Chüy Region, Kyrgyzstan. Its population was 2,005 in 2021. It is the center of Ibraimov rural community (ayyl aymagy) that also include villages Kara-Oy, Kyzyl-Asker, Lenin, Lenin-Jol, Taldy-Bulak.

References

Populated places in Chüy Region